Thomas Frith (1870 – March 1915) was an English professional footballer who played as a full-back.

References

1870 births
1915 deaths
Footballers from Grimsby
English footballers
Association football fullbacks
Humber Rovers F.C. players
Grimsby Town F.C. players
English Football League players